Wyresdale is the valley of the River Wyre in Lancashire, England.

It may refer to one of two civil parishes:

 Nether Wyresdale, Wyre
 Over Wyresdale, City of Lancaster